Gransmoor is a hamlet in the East Riding of Yorkshire, England.

Gransmoor forms part of the civil parish of Burton Agnes.

In 1823 Gransmoor was in the parish of Burton Agnes and the Wapentake of Dickering. Population was 85, which included six farmers and a carrier who operated between the hamlet and Bridlington once weekly. By 1840 population was 93, again with six farmers. A chapel was built in 1839 by the owner of all  of hamlet land.

References

External links

Villages in the East Riding of Yorkshire